Marisa Brunner is a retired Swiss football goalkeeper, who spent six years of her career playing for SC Freiburg in Germany's Bundesliga before moving to SC Sand where she in 2013 ended her playing career. Previous to her time in Germany she played for Swiss sides FC Aarau and SC LUwin.ch and was named the best Swiss player in 2007 and 2009.

She was the first-choice goalkeeper of the Swiss national team, for which she started to play in 2003.

Titles
 Swiss league: 5 (2002–06)
 Swiss cup: 4 (2002, 2004–06)

References

External links
 Marisa Brunner profile from UEFA website
 Player German domestic football stats  at DFB
 
 Profile  at soccerdonna.de

1982 births
Living people
Swiss women's footballers
Expatriate women's footballers in Germany
People from Aarau
Switzerland women's international footballers
SC Sand players
SC Freiburg (women) players
Swiss expatriate sportspeople in Germany
Swiss expatriate women's footballers
Women's association football goalkeepers
FC Luzern Frauen players
Swiss Women's Super League players
Frauen-Bundesliga players
2. Frauen-Bundesliga players
Sportspeople from Aargau